Chris Baldwin may refer to:

 Christopher Baldwin (born 1973), American illustrator and webcomic author
 Chris Baldwin (cyclist) (born 1975), American cyclist
 Chris Baldwin (director), British theatre director, professor and writer